Raynard S. Kington is an American educator and the 16th Head of School of Phillips Academy in Andover. Previously, he was the 13th president of Grinnell College. He has served as the deputy director and acting director of the National Institutes of Health.

Education 
At age 16, Kington became a student at the University of Michigan. He received a Bachelor of Science degree with distinction at age 19 and an M.D. degree at age 21. He completed a residency in internal medicine at Michael Reese Medical Center. He was then appointed as a Robert Wood Johnson Clinical Scholar at the University of Pennsylvania. While there, he received an Master of Business Administration degree with distinction, and a PhD degree in health policy and economics from the Wharton School.

National Institutes of Health 
Kington served as principal deputy director of the National Institutes of Health from 2003 to 2008. He led the agency in this capacity until August 17, 2009, when Francis Collins was appointed director. He continued to serve as principal deputy director of the agency until August 2010. Speaking of Kington's tenure at the agency, Senator Tom Harkin praised his leadership for judiciously allocating $10 billion in congressionally-approved funds, implementing then president Obama's Executive Order on human embryonic stem cell research, and strengthening conflict of interest regulations. He is on the board of directors of the American Council on Education. As Deputy Director, he co-authored a study which found that Black scientists were less likely than White scientists to win approval of research grants, exposing racial discrimination in academia.

Grinnell College 
Kington became the thirteenth president of Grinnell College on August 1, 2010. At Grinnell, Kington was noted for increasing diversity and inclusion efforts, promoting innovation and entrepreneurship, creating a prestigious Social Justice Prize, and working toward greater career preparation for students after they left college by championing Grinnell's Center for Careers, Life and Service. He led an effort to invest $140 million in renewing the campus. He strengthened ties to the city of Grinnell, in part by promoting a Zone of Confluence in which the campus and downtown areas work on joint redevelopment projects. During his presidency, he created a $300,000 annual prize to honor three persons throughout the world who have advanced the cause of social justice; the Grinnell College Innovator for Social Justice Prize has attracted substantial interest since its inception in 2010, and it has been cited as being the largest award of its kind by The Nation. He said that the purpose of the award was to encourage young persons who share a commitment to change the world for the better. Along with 350 college presidents, he signed a joint letter urging Congress to pass greater gun control measures. After Donald Trump was elected, he signed a letter along with 109 other college presidents, to urge the president-elect to take a more forceful stand against harassment, hate and acts of violence. In addition, Kington established a fund to spur innovation, oversaw the allocation of $140 million for campus buildings, and promoted ties to the city of Grinnell through investment programs. He faced criticism for his handling of an effort to expand the Union of Grinnell Student Dining Workers. To honor Raynard S. Kington’s achievements during his 10 years as Grinnell’s president, a popular outdoor plaza on Grinnell’s campus was named in his honor.
 In the early stages of the Covid-19 pandemic in March 2020, there were no cases at Grinnell, but Kington and the administration asked students to go home and continue their learning online, as a general safety precaution. In 2016 he said that his sexual orientation had not negatively affected his ability to serve as Grinnell's president.

Andover
In December 2019 Kington was selected to be the 16th Head of School of Phillips Academy in Andover, an elite boarding school with 1100 students. He took over the role in the summer of 2020, succeeding John Palfrey who resigned to become the head of the MacArthur Foundation. Kington is the first African-American and openly gay head of school in the academy's 240+ year existence. He began his leadership there as the school was grappling with the Covid-19 pandemic.

Family 
Kington is married to Peter T. Daniolos, a professor of child and adolescent psychiatry at the University of Iowa. They have two sons.

External links 
 Raynard Kington's address to the Grinnell College community, February 17, 2010

References 

Living people
University of Michigan Medical School alumni
Presidents of Grinnell College
University of Michigan alumni
Wharton School of the University of Pennsylvania alumni
National Institutes of Health people
LGBT African Americans
American LGBT scientists
Year of birth missing (living people)
LGBT academics
Heads of Phillips Academy Andover
Members of the National Academy of Medicine